Karen Elizabeth Thatcher (born February 29, 1984) is an American ice hockey forward. She was named to the United States women's ice hockey team for the 2010 Winter Olympics.

Personal life
Thatcher was born in Bryn Mawr, Pennsylvania, but grew up in Douglas, Massachusetts. She graduated from Providence College in 2006 with a bachelor's degree in biology.

She was employed as a physical therapy student assistant at Dodd Rehabilitation Hospital at The Ohio State University Wexner Medical Center. She is now a Doctor of Physical Therapy at The Ohio State University Wexner Medical Center in sports medicine and rehabilitation, and working to complete her PhD.

In 2017, she received the "Mary McMillan Scholarship" Award from the American Physical Therapy Association, an honor give to individuals with "superior scholastic ability and measurable potential for future contributions to both the physical therapy profession and the American Physical Therapy Association."  She also received the 2017 "Outstanding Student Award" from the Sports Section of the American Physical Therapy Association.

Playing career

NCAA
Thatcher transferred to the Providence Friars after spending the 2002–03 season with the Brown Bears. In her sophomore year, she tied for fourth on the Friars in points (she had 10 goals and 27 points). She was honored as Hockey East's sportsmanship award winner. In her junior year, Thatcher scored 58 points (25 goals, 33 assists). She was co-Hockey East Player of the Year (shared the honor with New Hampshire Wildcats player Stephanie Jones).

As a senior, Thatcher was the Friars scoring leader, and was a Top 10 candidate for the Patty Kazmaier Award. In addition, she was the team captain. For her NCAA career, she accumulated 167 points in 132 games played. During her time with the Friars, the team won Hockey East tournament championships in both 2004 and 2005. Thatcher is 10th on the Friars' all-time scoring list.

WWHL and CWHL
She played for the British Columbia Breakers of the Western Women's Hockey League (WWHL) in 2006–07. Statistically, she led the team and ranked 10th in the league with 36 points (19-17) in 26 games. The following year, she joined the Vaughan Flames of the Canadian Women's Hockey League and helped the team to the inaugural CWHL championship. In 2008–09, she returned to the WWHL and helped lead the Minnesota Whitecaps to the league championship.

Team USA
 Two-time member of the U.S. Women's National Team for the International Ice Hockey Federation World Women's Championship (gold-2008-09). Named to the team in 2007, but missed the tournament due to injury
 Three-time member of the U.S. Women's Select Team for the Four Nations Cup (1st-2008, 2nd-2006-07)
Member of the U.S. Women's Select Team in 2008-09
 Three-time member of the U.S. Women's Under-22 Select Team for the Under-22 Series with Canada (2002–04)
 Five-time USA Hockey Women's National Festival participant (2003–04, 2007–09)

Career stats

Coaching career
On August 20, 2010, the Providence Friars women's ice hockey program announced that Thatcher had been named as an assistant coach for the Friars.

Professional career
Thatcher works in sports medicine physical therapy for Ohio State University.

Awards and honors
 Providence Hockey East All-Decade Team
 Most Valuable Player, Pool B, 2007 Esso Canadian Women's Nationals
 Top Forward, Pool B, 2007 Esso Canadian Women's Nationals
Top 10 Finalist, 2006 Patty Kazmaier Award
2004 HOCKEY EAST Sportsmanship Award 
HOCKEY EAST Player of the Week Honors two times (11/8/04), and (1/31/05)
Named to the 2002-03 ECAC All-Rookie Team
Boston Bruins John Carlton Award in 2002
 Hockey East 10th Anniversary Team selection

References

External links
 
 U.S. Olympic Team profile

1984 births
Living people
American women's ice hockey forwards
Boston Blades players
Brown Bears women's ice hockey players
Ice hockey players from Massachusetts
Ice hockey players at the 2010 Winter Olympics
Medalists at the 2010 Winter Olympics
Olympic silver medalists for the United States in ice hockey
People from Douglas, Massachusetts
People from Bryn Mawr, Pennsylvania
Providence Friars women's ice hockey players
Sportspeople from Worcester County, Massachusetts
Minnesota Whitecaps players